The Philadelphia Phillies 2013 season was the 131st season in the history of the franchise. The Phillies played their first game of the season against the Atlanta Braves on April 1.

Offseason transactions
 December 6, 2012: Acquired Ben Revere from Minnesota Twins for Vance Worley and Trevor May.
 December 9, 2012: Acquired Michael Young from Texas Rangers for pitcher Josh Lindblom and minor league pitcher Lisalverto Bonilla.
 December 15, 2012: Signed Mike Adams to a two-year deal.
 December 15, 2012: Signed John Lannan to a one-year deal.
 January 22, 2013: Signed Delmon Young to a one-year deal.
 January 29, 2013: Signed Chad Durbin to a one-year deal.

Season notes
On April 5, the Kansas City Royals beat the Philadelphia Phillies 13–4, spoiling their home opener with a sellout crowd of 45,307 at Citizens Bank Park. The interleague matchup was a rare one between teams who first met in the 1980 World Series, as the Royals previously only visited Philadelphia in 2004. Hall of Famers Mike Schmidt and George Brett, rivals when the Phillies beat the Royals to win their first championship 33 years earlier, threw out the first pitches (along with SNLs Joe Piscopo).

On August 16, 2013, the Phillies fired manager Charlie Manuel replacing him with third base coach Ryne Sandberg on an interim basis. At the time, the Phillies were 53–67, and Manuel had exactly 1,000 wins with the Phillies, a milestone he achieved on August 12. The league and fan base mostly expressed sadness and gratitude to Manuel for his tenure. Several Phillies veterans, including Chase Utley and Cole Hamels, expressed regret and guilt feeling their lack of production led to Manuel's firing; they viewed Manuel as a fatherly figure. Sandberg commented the next day, "It was a roller coaster of a day emotionally. It affected me and I think it affects the players." Manuel received significant accolades within the media for his class in handling the situation, while the Phillies organization, namely general manager Rubén Amaro, Jr., were criticized within the media for firing Manuel at that point in the season, as well as for not having better players.

Season standings

National League East

National League Wild Card

Record vs. opponents

Game log

|- style="background:#fbb;"
| 1 || April 1 || @ Braves || 5–7 || Luis Avilán (1–0) || Cole Hamels (0–1) || Craig Kimbrel (1) || 51,456 || 0–1
|- style="background:#fbb;"
| 2 || April 3 || @ Braves || 2–9 || Paul Maholm (1–0) || Roy Halladay (0–1) || None || 24,289 || 0–2
|- style="background:#bfb;"
| 3 || April 4 || @ Braves || 2–0 || Cliff Lee (1–0) || Kris Medlen (0–1) || Jonathan Papelbon (1) || 18,295 || 1–2
|- style="background:#fbb;"
| 4 || April 5 || Royals || 4–13 || Bruce Chen (1–0) || Kyle Kendrick (0–1) || None || 45,307 || 1–3
|- style="background:#bfb;"
| 5 || April 6 || Royals || 4–3 || Antonio Bastardo (1–0) || Greg Holland (0–1) || None || 39,475 || 2–3 
|- style="background:#fbb;"
| 6 || April 7 || Royals || 8–9 || James Shields (1–1) || Cole Hamels (0–2) || Kelvin Herrera (1) || 39,451 || 2–4 
|- style="background:#fbb;"
| 7 || April 8 || Mets || 2–7 || Matt Harvey (2–0) || Roy Halladay (0–2) || None || 35,393 || 2–5
|- style="background:#bfb;"
| 8 || April 9 || Mets || 8–3 || Cliff Lee (2–0) || Dillon Gee (0–2) || None || 38,305 || 3–5
|- style="background:#bfb;"
| 9 || April 10 || Mets || 7–3 || Kyle Kendrick (1–1) || Jeremy Hefner (0–2) || None || 38,715 || 4–5
|- style="background:#bfb;"
| 10 || April 12 || @ Marlins || 3–1 (10) || Phillippe Aumont (1–0) || Jon Rauch (0–1) || Jonathan Papelbon (2) || 17,923 || 5–5
|- style="background:#fbb;"
| 11 || April 13 || @ Marlins || 1–2 || Steve Cishek (1–1) || Phillippe Aumont (1–1) || None || 20,037 || 5–6
|- style="background:#bfb;"
| 12 || April 14 || @ Marlins || 2–1 || Roy Halladay (1–2) || Jon Rauch (0–2) || Jonathan Papelbon (3) || 21,412 || 6–6
|- style="background:#fbb;"
| 13 || April 15 || @ Reds || 2–4 || Bronson Arroyo (2–1) || Jeremy Horst (0–1) || Aroldis Chapman (3) || 17,345 || 6–7
|- style="background:#fbb;"
| 14 || April 16 || @ Reds || 0–1 || Aroldis Chapman (2–0) || Phillippe Aumont (1–2) || None || 15,544 || 6–8
|- style="background:#fbb;"
| 15 || April 17 || @ Reds || 2–11 || Mike Leake (1–0) || John Lannan (0–1) || None || 16,467 || 6–9
|- style="background:#fbb;"
| 16 || April 18 || Cardinals || 3–4 || Adam Wainwright (3–1) || Mike Adams (0–1) || Edward Mujica (1) || 34,256 || 6–10
|- style="background:#bfb;"
| 17 || April 19 || Cardinals || 8–2 (7) || Roy Halladay (2–2) || Jaime García (1–1) || None || 34,092 || 7–10
|- style="background:#fbb;"
| 18 || April 20 || Cardinals || 0–5 || Lance Lynn (3–0) || Cliff Lee (2–1) || None || 41,050 || 7–11
|- style="background:#bfb;"
| 19 || April 21 || Cardinals || 7–3 || Mike Adams (1–1) || Mitchell Boggs (0–2) || None || 35,115 || 8–11
|- style="background:#bfb"
| 20 || April 22 || Pirates || 3–2 || Raúl Valdés (1–0) || Jared Hughes (1–2) || Jonathan Papelbon (4) || 35,385 || 9–11
|- style="background:#fbb;"
| 21 || April 23 || Pirates || 0–2 || Jeff Locke (2–1) || Cole Hamels (0–3) || Jason Grilli (8) || 31,002 || 9–12
|- style="background:#fbb;"
| 22 || April 24 || Pirates || 3–5 || Vin Mazzaro (1–0) || Mike Adams (1–2) || Jason Grilli (9) || 32,158 || 9–13
|- style="background:#fbb;"
| 23 || April 25 || Pirates || 4–6 || Justin Wilson (2–0) || Phillippe Aumont (1–3) || Tony Watson (1) || 33,443 || 9–14
|- style="background:#bfb"
| 24 || April 26 || @ Mets || 4–0 || Kyle Kendrick (2–1) || Dillon Gee (1–4) || None || 21,582 || 10–14
|- style="background:#bfb"
| 25 || April 27 || @ Mets || 9–4 || Jonathan Pettibone (1–0) || Shaun Marcum (0–1) || None || 29,248 || 11–14
|- style="background:#bfb"
| 26 || April 28 || @ Mets || 5–1 || Cole Hamels (1–3) || Jon Niese (2–2) || None || 28,990 || 12–14
|- style="background:#fbb;"
| 27 || April 30 || @ Indians || 2–14 || Zach McAllister (2–3) || Roy Halladay (2–3) || None || 10,841 || 12–15
|-

|- style="background:#fbb;"
| 28 || May 1 || @ Indians || 0–6 || Trevor Bauer (1–1) || Cliff Lee (2–2) || None || 12,730 || 12–16
|- style="background:#bfb"
| 29 || May 2 || Marlins || 7–2 || Kyle Kendrick (3–1) || Alex Sanabia (2–4) || None || 36,978 || 13–16
|- style="background:#bfb"
| 30 || May 3 || Marlins || 4–1 || Jonathan Pettibone (2–0) || Ricky Nolasco (2–3) || Jonathan Papelbon (5) || 36,292 || 14–16
|- style="background:#fbb"
| 31 || May 4 || Marlins || 0–2 || José Fernández (1–2) || Cole Hamels (1–4) || Steve Cishek (4) || 40,091 || 14–17
|- style="background:#fbb"
| 32 || May 5 || Marlins || 2–14 || Kevin Slowey (1–2) || Roy Halladay (2–4) || None || 45,276 || 14–18
|- style="background:#bfb"
| 33 || May 6 || @ Giants || 6–2 || Cliff Lee (3–2) || Madison Bumgarner (3–1) || None || 41,171 || 15–18
|- style="background:#bfb"
| 34 || May 7 || @ Giants || 6–2 || Kyle Kendrick (4–1) || Tim Lincecum (2–3) || None || 41,226 || 16–18
|- style="background:#fbb"
| 35 || May 8 || @ Giants || 3–4 (10) || Javier López (1–0) || Antonio Bastardo (1–1) || None || 41,048 || 16–19
|- style="background:#fbb"
| 36 || May 9 || @ Diamondbacks || 1–2 || Patrick Corbin (5–0) || Cole Hamels (1–5) || Heath Bell (4) || 20,002 || 16–20
|- style="background:#fbb"
| 37 || May 10 || @ Diamondbacks || 2–3 || Tony Sipp (2–1) || Mike Adams (1–3) || David Hernandez (1) || 31,900 || 16–21
|- style="background:#bfb"
| 38 || May 11 || @ Diamondbacks || 3–1 || Cliff Lee (4–2) || Trevor Cahill (2–4) || Jonathan Papelbon (6) || 28,113 || 17–21
|- style="background:#bfb"
| 39 || May 12 || @ Diamondbacks || 4–2 (10) || Justin De Fratus (1–0) || Matt Reynolds (0–1) || Jonathan Papelbon (7) || 32,785 || 18–21
|- style="background:#bfb"
| 40 || May 14 || Indians || 6–2 || Jonathan Pettibone (3–0) || Scott Kazmir (2–2) || None || 39,689 || 19–21
|- style="background:#fbb"
| 41 || May 15 || Indians || 4–10 || Corey Kluber (3–2) || Cole Hamels (1–6) || None || 38,440 || 19–22
|- style="background:#bfb"
| 42 || May 17 || Reds || 5–3 || Justin De Fratus (2–0) || Sean Marshall (0–1) || Jonathan Papelbon (8) || 43,129 || 20–22
|- style="background:#fbb"
| 43 || May 18 || Reds || 0–10 || Bronson Arroyo (4–4) || Kyle Kendrick (4–2) || None || 41,817 || 20–23
|- style="background:#bfb"
| 44 || May 19 || Reds ||  3–2 || Antonio Bastardo (2–1) || Aroldis Chapman (3–2) || None || 41,009 || 21–23
|- style="background:#fbb"
| 45 || May 20 || @ Marlins || 1–5 || Alex Sanabia (3–6) || Cole Hamels (1–7) || None || 13,231 || 21–24
|- style="background:#bfb"
| 46 || May 21 || @ Marlins || 7–3 || Tyler Cloyd (1–0) || Duane Below (0–1) || None || 13,996 || 22–24
|- style="background:#bfb"
| 47 || May 22 || @ Marlins || 3–0 || Cliff Lee (5–2) || Kevin Slowey (1–5) || None || 15,520 || 23–24
|- style="background:#fbb"
| 48 || May 24 || @ Nationals || 2–5 || Jordan Zimmermann (8–2) || Kyle Kendrick (4–3) || Rafael Soriano (14) || 28,980 || 23–25
|- style="background:#bfb"
| 49 || May 25 || @ Nationals || 5–3 || Chad Durbin (1–0) || Drew Storen (0–1) || Jonathan Papelbon (9) || 38,012 || 24–25
|- style="background:#fbb"
| 50 || May 26 || @ Nationals || 1–6 || Stephen Strasburg (3–5) || Cole Hamels (1–8) || None || 39,033 || 24–26
|- style="background:#fbb"
| 51 || May 27 || @ Red Sox || 3–9 || Alfredo Aceves (2–1) || Tyler Cloyd (1–1) || None || 33,627 || 24–27
|- style="background:#bfb"
| 52 || May 28 || @ Red Sox || 3–1 || Cliff Lee (6–2) || Ryan Dempster (2–6) || Jonathan Papelbon (10) || 33,643 || 25–27
|- style="background:#bfb"
| 53 || May 29 || Red Sox || 4–3 || Kyle Kendrick (5–3) || John Lackey (3–5) || Jonathan Papelbon (11) || 38,831 || 26–27
|- style="background:#fbb"
| 54 || May 30 || Red Sox || 2–9 || Franklin Morales (1–0) || Jonathan Pettibone (3–1) || None || 40,083 || 26–28
|- style="background:#fbb"
| 55 || May 31 || Brewers || 5–8 || Yovani Gallardo (4–5) || Cole Hamels (1–9) || Francisco Rogríguez (2) || 37,420 || 26–29
|-

|- style="background:#fbb"
| 56 || June 1 || Brewers || 3–4 || Wily Peralta (4–6) || Tyler Cloyd (1–2) || Francisco Rogríguez (3) || 41,114 || 26–30
|- style="background:#bfb"
| 57 || June 2 || Brewers || 7–5 || Cliff Lee (7–2) || Michael Fiers (1–4) || Antonio Bastardo (1) || 40,613 || 27–30
|- style="background:#bfb"
| 58 || June 3 || Marlins || 7–2 || Kyle Kendrick (6–3) || Tom Koehler (0–4) || None || 35,087 || 28–30
|- style="background:#bfb"
| 59 || June 4 || Marlins || 7–3 (11) || Michael Stutes (1–0) || Edgar Olmos (0–1) || None || 38,932 || 29–30
|- style="background:#bfb"
| 60 || June 5 || Marlins || 6–1 || Cole Hamels (2–9) || A. J. Ramos (0–2) || None || 38,643 || 30–30
|- style="background:#bfb"
| 61 || June 6 || @ Brewers || 5–1 || Tyler Cloyd (2–2) || Wily Peralta (4–7) || None || 21,581 || 31–30
|- style="background:#fbb"
| 62 || June 7 || @ Brewers || 4–5 || Francisco Rodríguez (1–0) || Jeremy Horst (0–2) || None || 31,417 || 31–31
|- style="background:#fbb"
| 63 || June 8 || @ Brewers || 3–4 || Tyler Thornburg (1–0) || Kyle Kendrick (6–4) || Francisco Rodríguez (4) || 38,267 || 31–32
|- style="background:#fbb"
| 64 || June 9 || @ Brewers || 1–9 || Kyle Lohse (2–6) || Jonathan Pettibone (3–2) || None || 38,300 || 31–33
|- style="background:#fbb"
| 65 || June 11 || @ Twins || 2–3 || Brian Duensing (1–1) || Mike Adams (1–4) || Glen Perkins (14) || 30,104 || 31–34
|- style="background:#fbb"
| 66 || June 12 || @ Twins || 3–4 || Brian Duensing (2–1) || Antonio Bastardo (2–2) || Glen Perkins (15) || 28,910 || 31–35
|- style="background:#bfb"
| 67 || June 13 || @ Twins || 3–2 || Cliff Lee (8–2) || Jared Burton (0–4) || Jonathan Papelbon (12) || 28,519 || 32–35
|- style="background:#bfb"
| 68 || June 14 || @ Rockies || 8–7 || Michael Stutes (2–0) || Wilton López (1–3) || Jonathan Papelbon (13) || 36,114 || 33–35
|- style="background:#fbb"
| 69 || June 15 || @ Rockies || 5–10 || Tyler Chatwood (4–1) || Jonathan Pettibone (3–3) || None || 35,516 || 33–36
|- style="background:#fbb"
| 70 || June 16 || @ Rockies || 2–5 || Jhoulys Chacín (5–3) || Cole Hamels (2–10) || Rex Brothers (3) || 45,186 || 33–37
|- style="background:#bfb"
| 71 || June 17 || Nationals || 5–4 || Jonathan Papelbon (1–0) || Fernando Abad (0–2) || None || 44,990 || 34–37
|- style="background:#bfb"
| 72 || June 18 || Nationals || 4–2 || Cliff Lee (9–2) || Ross Detwiler (2–5) || Jonathan Papelbon (14) || 38,188 || 35–37
|- style="background:#fbb"
| 73 || June 19 || Nationals || 2–6 || Drew Storen (2–1) || Michael Stutes (2–1) || None || 39,594 || 35–38
|- style="background:#fbb"
| 74 || June 21 || Mets || 3–4 || Jeremy Hefner (2–6) || Cole Hamels (2–11) || Bobby Parnell (12) || 40,062 || 35–39
|- style="background:#bfb"
| 75 || June 22 || Mets || 8–7 || Jonathan Papelbon (2–0) || Carlos Torres (0–1) || None || 45,725 || 36–39
|- style="background:#fbb"
| 76 || June 23 || Mets || 0–8 || Matt Harvey (7–1) || John Lannan (0–2) || None || 44,951 || 36–40
|- style="background:#fbb"
| 77 || June 24 || @ Padres || 3–4 (10) || Joe Thatcher (3–1) ||Justin De Fratus (2–1) || None || 26,265 || 36–41
|- style="background:#bfb"
| 78 || June 25 || @ Padres || 6–2 || Kyle Kendrick (7–4) || Jason Marquis (9–3) || None || 24,695 || 37–41
|- style="background:#bfb"
| 79 || June 26 || @ Padres || 7–5 (13) || Joe Savery (1–0) || Tommy Layne (0–2) || Jonathan Papelbon (15) || 25,610 || 38–41
|- style="background:#fbb"
| 80 || June 27 || @ Dodgers || 4–6 || Zack Greinke (5–2) || Justin De Fratus (2–2)  || Kenley Jansen (7) || 51,037 || 38–42
|- style="background:#bfb"
| 81 || June 28 || @ Dodgers || 16–1 || John Lannan (1–2) || Chris Capuano (2–5) || None || 48,828 || 39–42
|- style="background:#fbb"
| 82 || June 29 || @ Dodgers || 3–4 || Kenley Jansen (2–3) || Justin De Fratus (2–3)  || None || 52,455 || 39–43
|- style="background:#fbb"
| 83 || June 30 || @ Dodgers || 1–6 || Stephen Fife (3–2) || Kyle Kendrick (7–5)  || None || 42,405 || 39–44
|-

|- style="background:#bfb"
| 84 || July 2 || @ Pirates || 3–1 || Jonathan Pettibone (4–3) || Brandon Cumpton (0–1) || Jonathan Papelbon (16) || 30,301 || 40–44
|- style="background:#fbb"
| 85 || July 3 || @ Pirates || 5–6 || Jeff Locke (8–1) || John Lannan (1–3) || Jason Grilli (28) || 33,197 || 40–45
|- style="background:#bfb"
| 86 || July 4 || @ Pirates || 6–4 || Cole Hamels (3–11) || Gerrit Cole (4–1) || Jonathan Papelbon (17) || 35,328 || 41–45
|- style="background:#bfb"
| 87 || July 5 || Braves || 5–4 || Cliff Lee (10–2) || Paul Maholm (9–7) || Jonathan Papelbon (18) || 42,044 || 42–45
|- style="background:#fbb"
| 88 || July 6 || Braves || 4–13 || Tim Hudson (5–7) || Kyle Kendrick (7–6) || None || 37,044 || 42–46
|- style="background:#bfb"
| 89 || July 7 || Braves || 7–3 || Jonathan Pettibone (5–3) || Kris Medlen (6–8) || None || 38,148 || 43–46
|- style="background:#bfb"
| 90 || July 8 || Nationals || 3–2 || John Lannan (2–3) || Dan Haren (4–10) || Jonathan Papelbon (19) || 33,061 || 44–46
|- style="background:#bfb"
| 91 || July 9 || Nationals || 4–2 || Cole Hamels (4–11) || Taylor Jordan (0–2) || Antonio Bastardo (2) || 33,502 || 45–46
|- style="background:#fbb"
| 92 || July 10 || Nationals || 1–5 || Gio González (7–3) || Cliff Lee (10–3) || None || 34,513 || 45–47
|- style="background:#bfb"
| 93 || July 11 || Nationals || 3–1 || Kyle Kendrick (8–6) || Jordan Zimmermann (12–4) || Jonathan Papelbon (20) || 40,086 || 46–47
|- style="background:#bbb"
| – || July 12 || White Sox || colspan=6 | Postponed (rain); Makeup: July 13
|- style="background:#fbb"
| 94 || July 13 (1) || White Sox || 4–5 (11) || Ramón Troncoso (1–2) || J. C. Ramírez (0–1) || Addison Reed (24) || 41,562 || 46–48
|- style="background:#bfb"
| 95 || July 13 (2) || White Sox || 2–1 (13) || Joe Savery (2–0) || Simón Castro (0–1) || None || 43,249 || 47–48
|- style="background:#bfb"
| 96 || July 14 || White Sox || 4–3 (10) || Antonio Bastardo (3–2) || David Purcey (0–1) || None || 40,151 || 48–48
|- style="background:#bbcaff;"
| – || July 16 ||colspan="7" |2013 Major League Baseball All-Star Game at Citi Field in Queens, New York
|- style="background:#bfb"
| 97 || July 19 || @ Mets || 13–8 || Kyle Kendrick (9–6) || Jeremy Hefner (4–7) || None || 35,021 || 49–48
|- style="background:#fbb"
| 98 || July 20 || @ Mets || 4–5 || Gonzalez Germen (1–1) || Cole Hamels (4–12) || Bobby Parnell (18) || 26,722 || 49–49
|- style="background:#fbb"
| 99 || July 21 || @ Mets || 0–5 || Matt Harvey (8–2) || Cliff Lee (10–4) || None || 32,127 || 49–50
|- style="background:#fbb"
| 100 || July 23 || @ Cardinals || 1–4 || Shelby Miller (10–6) || Jonathan Pettibone (5–4) || Edward Mujica (29) || 44,780 || 49–51
|- style="background:#fbb"
| 101 || July 24 || @ Cardinals || 3–11 || Jake Westbrook (7–4) || John Lannan (2–4) || None || 44,317 || 49–52
|- style="background:#fbb"
| 102 || July 25 || @ Cardinals || 1–3 || Lance Lynn (12–5) || Kyle Kendrick (9–7) || Edward Mujica (30) || 45,567 || 49–53
|- style="background:#fbb"
| 103 || July 26 || @ Tigers || 1–2 || Doug Fister (9–5) || Cole Hamels (4–13) || Joaquín Benoit (10) || 42,317 || 49–54
|- style="background:#fbb"
| 104 || July 27 || @ Tigers || 0–10 || Max Scherzer (15–1) || Raúl Valdés (1–1) || None || 41,970 || 49–55
|- style="background:#fbb"
| 105 || July 28 || @ Tigers || 4–12 || Rick Porcello (8–6) || Jake Diekman (0–1) || None || 41,326 || 49–56
|- style="background:#bfb"
| 106 || July 30 || Giants || 7–3 || John Lannan (3–4) || Barry Zito (4–8) || None || 36,492 || 50–56
|- style="background:#fbb"
| 107 || July 31 || Giants || 2–9 || Chad Gaudin (5–2) || Kyle Kendrick (9–8) || None || 34,067 || 50–57
|-

|- style="background:#fbb"
| 108 || August 1 || Giants || 1–2 || Matt Cain (7–6) || Jonathan Papelbon (2–1) || Sergio Romo (25) || 33,645 || 50–58
|- style="background:#fbb"
| 109 || August 2 || Braves || 4–6 ||  Kris Medlen (8–10) || Ethan Martin (0–1) || Craig Kimbrel (32) || 35,087 || 50–59
|- style="background:#fbb"
| 110 || August 3 || Braves || 4–5 (12) || Luis Avilán (4–0) || Jake Diekman (0–2) || Craig Kimbrel (33) || 41,161 || 50–60
|- style="background:#fbb"
| 111 || August 4 || Braves || 1–4 || Alex Wood (2–2) || Cliff Lee (10–5) || Craig Kimbrel (34) || 37,235 || 50–61
|- style="background:#bfb"
| 112 || August 6 || Cubs || 9–8 || Kyle Kendrick (10–8) || Edwin Jackson (7–12) || None || 36,841 || 51–61
|- style="background:#fbb"
| 113 || August 7 || Cubs || 2–5 || Pedro Strop (2–4) || Luis García (0–1) || Kevin Gregg (23) || 36,171 || 51–62
|- style="background:#bfb"
| 114 || August 8 || Cubs || 12–1 || Ethan Martin (1–1) || Jeff Samardzija (6–11) || None || 42,510 || 52–62
|- style="background:#fbb"
| 115 || August 9 || @ Nationals || 2–9 || Dan Haren (7–11) || John Lannan (3–5) || None || 27,831 || 52–63
|- style="background:#fbb"
| 116 || August 10 || @ Nationals || 5–8 || Tanner Roark (1–0) || Jake Diekman (0–3) || Rafael Soriano (29) || 32,676 || 52–64
|- style="background:#fbb"
| 117 || August 11 || @ Nationals || 0–6 || Stephen Strasburg (6–9) || Kyle Kendrick (10–9) || None || 32,355 || 52–65
|- style="background:#bfb"
| 118 || August 12 || @ Braves || 5–1 || Cole Hamels (5–13) || Julio Teherán (9–6) || None || 20,676 || 53–65
|- style="background:#fbb"
| 119 || August 13 || @ Braves || 1–3 || Kris Medlen (10–10) || Ethan Martin (1–2) || Craig Kimbrel (37) || 21,697 || 53–66
|- style="background:#fbb"
| 120 || August 14 || @ Braves || 3–6 || Brandon Beachy (2–0) || John Lannan (3–6) || Craig Kimbrel (38) || 18,638 || 53–67
|- style="background:#fbb"
| 121 || August 16 || Dodgers || 0–4 || Zack Greinke (11–3) || Cliff Lee (10–6) || None || 36,964 || 53–68
|- style="background:#fbb"
| 122 || August 17 || Dodgers || 0–5 || Clayton Kershaw (12–7) || Kyle Kendrick (10–10) || None || 42,082 || 53–69
|- style="background:#bfb"
| 123 || August 18 || Dodgers || 3–2 || Jonathan Papelbon (3–1) || Brandon League (6–4) || None || 40,336 || 54–69
|- style="background:#bfb"
| 124 || August 19 || Rockies || 5–4 || Ethan Martin (2–2) || Jeff Manship (0–3) || Jonathan Papelbon (21) || 35,269 || 55–69
|- style="background:#fbb"
| 125 || August 20 || Rockies || 3–5 || Jorge de la Rosa (13–6) || Tyler Cloyd (2–3) || Rafael Betancourt (16) || 34,018 || 55–70
|- style="background:#bfb"
| 126 || August 21 || Rockies || 4–3 || Jake Diekman (1–3) || Rafael Betancourt (2–4) || None  || 36,578 || 56–70
|- style="background:#bfb"
| 127 || August 22 || Rockies || 5–4 || César Jiménez (1–0) || Rafael Betancourt (2–5) || None || 31,619 || 57–70
|- style="background:#bfb"
| 128 || August 23 || Diamondbacks || 4–3 || Jonathan Papelbon (4–1) || Heath Bell (4–2) || None || 32,619 || 58–70
|- style="background:#fbb"
| 129 || August 24 || Diamondbacks || 7–12 (18) || Trevor Cahill (5–10) || Casper Wells (0–1) || None || 34,637 || 58–71
|- style="background:#bfb"
| 130 || August 25 || Diamondbacks || 9–5 || Roy Halladay (3–4) || Patrick Corbin (13–4) || None || 36,128 || 59–71
|- style="background:#bfb"
| 131 || August 26 || @ Mets || 2–1 || Cliff Lee (11–6) || Zack Wheeler (6–3) || Jonathan Papelbon (22) || 25,784 || 60–71
|- style="background:#fbb"
| 132 || August 27 || @ Mets || 0–5 || Jon Niese (6–6) || Kyle Kendrick (10–11) || None || 25,700 || 60–72
|- style="background:#bfb"
| 133 || August 28 || @ Mets || 6–2 || Cole Hamels (6–13) || Daisuke Matsuzaka (0–2) || None || 24,447 || 61–72
|- style="background:#fbb"
| 134 || August 29 || @ Mets || 3–11 || Carlos Torres (3–2) || Ethan Martin (2–3) || None || 22,008 || 61–73
|- style="background:#bfb"
| 135 || August 30 || @ Cubs || 6–5 || B. J. Rosenberg (1–0) || Kevin Gregg (2–4) || Jonathan Papelbon (23) || 27,763 || 62–73
|- style="background:#fbb"
| 136 || August 31 || @ Cubs || 3–4 || Carlos Villanueva (3–8) || Zach Miner (0–1) || Kevin Gregg (28) || 36,410 || 62–74
|-

|- style="background:#fbb"
| 137 || September 1 || @ Cubs || 1–7 || Jake Arrieta (3–3) || Kyle Kendrick (10–12) || None || 31,859 || 62–75
|- style="background:#bfb"
| 138 || September 2 || Nationals || 3–2 || B. J. Rosenberg (2–0) || Tyler Clippard (6–3) || Jonathan Papelbon (24) || 30,248 || 63–75
|- style="background:#fbb"
| 139 || September 3 || Nationals || 6–9 || Gio González (9–6) || Ethan Martin (2–4) || Rafael Soriano (37) || 28,826 || 63–76
|- style="background:#fbb"
| 140 || September 4 || Nationals || 2–3 || Jordan Zimmermann (16–8) || Jake Diekman (1–4) || Rafael Soriano (38) || 31,495 || 63–77
|- style="background:#bfb"
| 141 || September 6 || Braves || 2–1 || Cliff Lee (12–6) || Mike Minor (13–6) || Jonathan Papelbon (25) || 37,088 || 64–77
|- style="background:#bfb"
| 142 || September 7 || Braves || 6–5 || Jonathan Papelbon (5–1) || Freddy García (3–6) || None || 36,330 || 65–77
|- style="background:#bfb"
| 143 || September 8 || Braves || 3–2 || Cole Hamels (7–13) || David Carpenter (3–1) || B. J. Rosenberg (1) || 38,706 || 66–77
|- style="background:#fbb"
| 144 || September 10 || Padres || 2–8 || Andrew Cashner (9–8) || Tyler Cloyd (2–4) || None || 29,242 || 66–78
|- style="background:#bfb"
| 145 || September 11 || Padres || 4–2 || Cliff Lee (13–6) || Nick Vincent (4–3) || Jonathan Papelbon (26) || 30,351 || 67–78
|- style="background:#bfb"
| 146 || September 12 || Padres || 10–5 || Justin De Fratus (3–3) || Tyson Ross (3–8) || None || 29,986 || 68–78
|- style="background:#fbb"
| 147 || September 13 || @ Nationals || 1–6 || Ross Ohlendorf (4–0) || Kyle Kendrick (10–13) || None || 31,325 || 68–79
|- style="background:#bfb"
| 148 || September 14 || @ Nationals || 5–4 || Cole Hamels (8–13) || Gio González (10–7) || Jonathan Papelbon (27) || 33,972 || 69–79
|- style="background:#fbb"
| 149 || September 15 || @ Nationals || 2–11 || Jordan Zimmermann (18–8) || Tyler Cloyd (2–5) || None || 33,746 || 69–80
|- style="background:#bfb"
| 150 || September 16 || Marlins || 12–2 || Cliff Lee (14–6) || Sam Dyson (0–1) || None || 31,266 || 70–80
|- style="background:#bfb"
| 151 || September 17 || Marlins || 6–4 || Roy Halladay (4–4) || Brian Flynn (0–2) || Jonathan Papelbon (28) || 28,872 || 71–80
|- style="background:#fbb"
| 152 || September 18 || Marlins || 3–4 (10) || Brad Hand (1–1) || César Jiménez (1–1) || Steve Cishek (31) || 28,908 || 71–81
|- style="background:#fbb"
| 153 || September 20 || Mets || 4–6 || Daisuke Matsuzaka (2–3) || Cole Hamels (8–14) || LaTroy Hawkins (11) || 33,117 || 71–82
|- style="background:#fbb"
| 154 || September 21 || Mets || 4–5 (7) || Dillon Gee (12–10) || Tyler Cloyd (2–6) || None || 36,650 || 71–83
|- style="background:#fbb"
| 155 || September 22 || Mets || 3–4 || Carlos Torres (4–5) || Cliff Lee (14–7) || LaTroy Hawkins (12) || 44,398 || 71–84
|- style="background:#fbb"
| 156 || September 23 || @ Marlins || 0–4 || Nathan Eovaldi (4–6) || Roy Halladay (4–5) || None || 18,627 || 71–85
|- style="background:#bfb"
| 157 || September 24 || @ Marlins || 2–1 || Michael Stutes (3–1) || Henderson Álvarez (4–6) || Jonathan Papelbon (29) || 19,375 || 72–85
|- style="background:#fbb"
| 158 || September 25 || @ Marlins || 2–3 || Chad Qualls (5–2) || Ethan Martin (2–5) || Steve Cishek (33) || 19,180 || 72–86
|- style="background:#fbb"
| 159 || September 26 || @ Braves || 1–7 || David Hale (1–0) || Tyler Cloyd (2–7) || None || 27,858 || 72–87
|- style="background:#fbb"
| 160 || September 27 || @ Braves || 0–1 || Kris Medlen (15–12) || Cliff Lee (14–8) || Craig Kimbrel (50) || 38,711 || 72–88
|- style="background:#bfb"
| 161 || September 28 || @ Braves || 5–4 || Luis García (1–1) || Mike Minor (13–9) || None || 38,171 || 73–88
|- style="background:#fbb"
| 162 || September 29 || @ Braves || 5–12 || Julio Teherán (14–8) || Zach Miner (0–2) || None || 42,194 || 73–89
|-

| style="text-align:left;"|
The game was suspended at 0–0 during the middle of the ninth inning due to heavy rain, and continued at 5:30 p.m. on April 17, prior to the start of the game scheduled for that day.

RosterAll players who made an appearance for the Phillies during 2013 are included. Farm system 

External links
 2013 Philadelphia Phillies season at Baseball Reference''
 Philadelphia Phillies' official website

References

Philadelphia Phillies seasons
Philadelphia Phillies
Philadelphia Phillies